Paolo Poiret (29 September 1945 – 1 November 2015) was an Italian actor and voice actor.

Biography
Poiret began working on stage in 1972 and entered a career of film, television and voice acting in 1975. He was mostly active as a voice dubber during the 1980s and he dubbed over the voices of Robert De Niro, Craig T. Nelson, Steve Martin, Harvey Keitel and Arnold Schwarzenegger in some of their films. He was also the Italian voice of Leonard "Bones" McCoy (portrayed by DeForest Kelley) in Star Trek III: The Search for Spock.

In Poiret's animated roles, he was renowned locally and internationally for providing the Italian dubbed voice of The Horned King (originally voiced by John Hurt) in the 1985 Disney film The Black Cauldron. He also voiced Venger in the Italian version of Dungeons & Dragons.

Death
After a long illness, Poiret died on 1 November 2015 in Rocca San Giovanni at the age of 70.

Filmography

Cinema
Killer Cop (1975)
Stark System (1980)
Cartoline da Roma (1980)

Television
Una tranquilla coppia di killer (1982)
Vuoto di memoria (1983)
A viso coperto (1985)
Puccini (2009)

Dubbing roles

Animation
The Horned King in The Black Cauldron
Venger in Dungeons & Dragons

Live action
Neal Page in Planes, Trains and Automobiles
Louis Cyphre in Angel Heart
Steve Freeling in Poltergeist
Edward R. Rooney in Ferris Bueller's Day Off
Roger Murdock in Airplane!
Leonard McCoy in Star Trek III: The Search for Spock
Judas Iscariot in The Last Temptation of Christ
Lord Kalidor in Red Sonja
Terry Gilliam's roles in Monty Python's The Meaning of Life
Herman Dietrich in Indiana Jones and the Raiders of the Lost Ark
Andrew Bogomil in Beverly Hills Cop
Andrew Bogomil in Beverly Hills Cop II
Wylie Cooper in Best Defense
Alan Shepard in The Right Stuff

References

External links

1945 births
2015 deaths
Italian male voice actors
Italian male television actors
Italian male film actors
Italian male stage actors
Italian voice directors
Male actors from Milan
20th-century Italian male actors
21st-century Italian male actors
Disease-related deaths in Abruzzo